Shafik Chokin (Şapyq Şökıūly Şökin) (1 October 1912 – 4 July 2003) was a Kazakh scientist in the energy sector. He was a Doctor of Sciences, Professor, Founder of the Kazakh Scientific Research Institute of Power Engineering, Deputy of The Supreme Soviet of the USSR, associate of the chairman of Soviet of the Union chamber, and President of Kazakhstan Academy of Sciences.

Biography 
Shafiq Chokin was born on 1 October 1912 in Bayanaul District, in Pavlodar Province to a poor Muslim family. His father died in 1918 and his mother also died shortly after, so Shafiq was raised by his older brother Riza Muhammed Chokin. He was educated at Omsk Agricultural Institute. After graduation in 1937 he worked in the Kazakh Trust of Agricultural Electrification, where he enjoyed a successful career, being promoted to the positions of Chief Engineer and Deputy Director. In 1943 he was invited by Kanysh Satpayev to become the Chairman of the energy sector of Kazakh Branch of the Academy of Sciences of USSR. A year later, in 1944, Chokin established the Kazakh Scientific Research Institute of Power Engineering and served as its director till 1988. During Chokin's directorship the Institute became one of the USSR's most recognized scientific research organizations in the energy sector. From 1954 to 1968 he was a member of the Presidium of Kazakhstan Academy of Sciences. In 1964, after the death of Kanysh Satpayev, Chokin was elected as the President of the Academy  and occupied this position till 1967. During his presidency he was also elected as a deputy of The Supreme Soviet of the USSR and appointed as an associate of the chairman of Soviet of the Union chamber. From 1966 to 1971 Chokin was a member of Central Committee of Communist Party of Kazakhstan.

On 14 June 1988 by the collective decision of Ministry of Energy and Electrification of USSR and the Presidium of Kazakhstan Academy of Sciences Chokin was appointed as an honorary director of Kazakh Scientific Research Institute of Energy. On 30 September 1992 by the decision of the Board of Ministers of the Republic of Kazakhstan, when the academician was still alive, Kazakh Scientific Research Institute of Energy was given the name of Shafik Chokin.

In 1996 President Nursultan Nazarbayev awarded Shafik Chokin the "National Hero" award, the highest honor for citizens of Kazakhstan.

Legacy 

The following are named after Shafik Chokin:

 "Shafik Chokin" Energy Research and Design Institute, Nazarbayev University, Energy Center 
 a street in Pavlodar city
 an award in the field of energy of the Presidium of Kazakhstan Academy of Sciences
 an award in the field of energy of the National Engineering Academy of the Republic of Kazakhstan

References 

 History of Kazakhstan Academy of Sciences (in Russian)
 Biography of Shafik Chokin (in Russian)

1912 births
2003 deaths
People from Pavlodar Region
Kazakhstani scientists
Soviet scientists
Communist Party of the Soviet Union members
Heroes of Kazakhstan
Omsk State Agrarian University alumni